Westinghouse High School, also known as The Academy at Westinghouse or Westinghouse Academy is one of 10 high schools and of four 6-12 schools in the Pittsburgh Public Schools. It is located in the Homewood neighborhood of Pittsburgh, Pennsylvania, and is named for Pittsburgh resident and entrepreneur George Westinghouse. As of October 2019, Westinghouse has an enrollment of 697 students, 95% of whom are African American. Westinghouse High School serves East Hills, East Liberty, Highland Park, Homewood North, Homewood South, Homewood West, Larimer, Lincoln-Lemington-Belmar, and Point Breeze North, as well as the nearby town of Wilkinsburg. The school's mascot is a bulldog.

History

Early years 
Westinghouse High School opened in 1917 and served a diverse population of middle- and working-class individuals who lived in the neighborhood of Homewood in Pittsburgh, PA. The school was built and opened by industrialist George Westinghouse whose home and electric business was located in Homewood. While the school opened in 1917, the building was not completed until 1924, and another annex was added in 1932 to give space for the 3,300 pupils that were enrolled at that time. The school employed well-regarded faculty and offered English, mathematics, history, science and technical programs like engine repair for boys and home economics for girls.

1940s and 1950s 
Midcentury marked a change in the racial makeup of Homewood as more Italian immigrants moved to the neighborhood and their children attended Westinghouse. Furthermore, African Americans made up larger percentages of the students at Westinghouse as White residents began moving to the suburbs.  By 1955, African American students made up 53.4% of enrolled students at Westinghouse.

By this time Westinghouse had produced several notable alumni including musicians Billy Strayhorn, Mary Lou Williams, and Errol Garner.

1960s 
White families continued to move to the suburbs during this time which considerably changed the racial makeup of the school. The school's budget was also affected by the changing demographics of the area. Even in this time of great change, many students continued to receive scholarships and other accolades.

Recent Decades 
During the 2011-2012 school year, the school absorbed students from the East Liberty neighborhood due to the closure of nearby Peabody High School. Due to increasing violence throughout the city, and the shooting of 15-year-old Westinghouse High School Student Dayvon Vikers, students from Westinghouse High School organized a youth-led protest against violence on April 2, 2022

In 2022, Westinghouse’s undefeated football season came to an end in the PIAA 2A State Championship Game, as the Bulldogs couldn’t prevent the Southern Columbia Tigers from winning their sixth consecutive state title 37-22.
</ref>

2023 shooting 

On February 14, 2023, four students were shot outside the school as students were being dismissed for the day.

Sports

Overview 
Westinghouse high school offers the following sports programs: Football, track and  cross country, volleyball, basketball, tennis, wrestling, and baseball.

Football 
Westinghouse High School has a long football sports history. The first championship game was the 1921 season. Westinghouse’s football program is notable because it reached 500 total wins by 1996 -- a feat reached faster than many other high schools. The most recent city league title was won by Westinghouse in 2020 with a score of 36 - 20 vs. Allderdice High School

Westinghouse Football winning championships: 1921-1922, 1927-1928, 1928-1929, 1930-1931, 1934-1935, 1938-1939, 1939-1940, 1941-1942, 1942-1943, 1944-1945, 1945-1946, 1946-1947,1947-1948, 1948-1949, 1949-1950, 1951-1952, 1954-1955, 1955-1956, 1956-1957, 1957-1958, 1958-1959, 1959-1960, 1960-1961, 1961-1962, 1963-1964, 1964-1965, 1965-1966, 1966-1967, 1970-1971, 1981-1982, 1992-1993, 1993-1994, 1995-1996, 1996-1997, 2020-2021

Notable Players and Coaches 
Notable players who have gone on to play in the NFL include:

Tony Liscio, Art Dremer, Ron Casey, Mark Ellison, Wes Garnett, Jon Henderson, Eugene Harrison, Dave Kalina, Melvin Myricks, Mose Lantz, William Robinson and John Greene.

Notable Westinghouse coaches include Pro Burton, Pete Dimperio and George Webb, all winning over 100 games and multiple championships in their coaching careers.

Basketball

Men 
The Westinghouse Men’s Basketball Team won its first conference championship in the 1918-1919 season. Other championship year include: 1942-1943, 1943-1944, 1947-1948, 1949-1950, 1950-1951, 1951-1952, 1952-1953, 1953-1954, 1971-1972, 1997-1998, 1998-1999, 1999-2000, 2011-2012, 2012-2013.

Notable Players and Referees 
Notable athletes that came from Westinghouse High School’s men’s basketball program include Naismith Memorial Basketball Hall of Famer Chuck Cooper, the first African-American player drafted into the NBA; Edward Flemming who was drafted by the Rochester Royals in 1955; Maurice Stokes who played for the Rochester Royals and was the 1956 NBA Rookie of the Year, 3 time all star, and NBA Hall of Famer; and Kenneth Hudson, who was the first full-time African American NBA referee.

Women 
The Westinghouse High School women's basketball team won their first conference championship in 1983. The team won 15 straight conference championships from the 1995-1996 season through the 2008-2009 season. Throughout that span they went to 18 title games.

Championship seasons:  1982-1983, 1983-1984, 1988-1989, 1989-1990, 1994-1995, 1995-1996, 1996-1997, 1997-1998, 1998-1999, 1999-2000, 2000-2001, 2001-2002, 2002-2003,2003-2004, 2004-2005, 2005-2006, 2006-2007, 2007-2008, 2008-2009, 2010-2011, 2011-2012, 2012-2013.

Notable players 
Notable player Shawnice Wilson came out of the Westinghouse High School women's basketball program. She played for the University of Miami and the WNBA.

Track and Cross Country 
The track team has a history of successful league championships:

Men's Track Championships: 1962-1963, 1963-1964, 1964-1965, 1965-1966, 1966-1967 1968-1969, 1969-1970, 1970-1971

Men's Track Relay Championships: 1957-1958, 1958-1959, 1962-1963, 1963-1964, 1964-1965, 1966-1967, 1967-1968, 1968-1969, 1969-1970, 1970-1971

Women's Track Relay Championships: 1979-1980, 1980-1981, 1981-1982

Cross Country: 1959-1960 season

Volleyball 
Westinghouse High School won its first volleyball championship in 1955 and went on to win 5 state championships in a 6-year period. The team of the 1930s and 40s were very successful in their district.

Historical state championships for the Westinghouse volleyball team include the seasons of 1936-1937, 1937-1938, 1938-1939, 1940-1941.

Courses and Training Programs

Overview 
At Westinghouse High School there are many Career and Technical Education (CTE) programs including business administration, sports and entertainment, carpentry, cosmetology, culinary arts, emergency response technology, and health careers. All certificate programs give students the opportunity to receive college credit for their work.

Business Administration 
In Business Administration, Sports & Entertainment (B.A.S.E), students learn about marketing and accounting and get certificates in Microsoft Office and OSHA. Students also go on field trips to sports facilities. This program partners with Point Park University.

Culinary Arts 
Culinary arts is a CTE program at Westinghouse High School and Carrick High School. Students in this program are offered the following ServSafe certificates: food manager, food handler, and food allergen. They also can become competent in safety and pollution prevention.

Emergency Response Technology (E.R.T.) 
Students in these courses learn how to apply skills and tech knowledge required to perform duties like law enforcement, emergency medical services, and firefighting.

Carpentry 
Students in carpentry CTE learn to build things like tables and dog houses. Allderdice High School students in the nearby neighborhood of Squirrel Hill in Pittsburgh have the opportunity to come to Westinghouse to participate in these courses. Students in carpentry learn to use hand tools, power tools, blueprint reading, site preparation and layout, footings and foundations, framing, floor construction, wall construction, roof construction, exterior finish, interior finish, estimation, and other skills.

Cosmetology 
The cosmetology program helps students enrolled learn about beauty treatments of the hair, complexion, and hands. These include facials, waxing, eyebrows, nails, haircuts, and hair dying. Students tour salons around Pittsburgh to see how they run their businesses. At the end of the program, and after earning 1250 hours of training, students may earn a Pennsylvania state cosmetology license.

National Landmark Status 
Westinghouse High School's building received Historic Landmark Status in 2001. The architectural style of the school is classical revival, and the design firm was Ingham & Boyd.

Alma Mater 
Oh, Westinghouse forever, loyal and true.

Nothing can ever change our love for you.

Rah! Rah! Rah!

Oh, Westinghouse forever we're true to you,

we love our colors of GOLD and BLUE

Notable alumni

Tom Casey - Professional football player and Canadian Football Hall of Fame inductee
Chuck Cooper - First African-American drafted in the NBA
Frank Cunimondo - Jazz pianist
Erroll Davis - Education administrator and chancellor, University System of Georgia; businessman
Anthony M. DeLuca - politician
Jim Ellis - Swim coach and subject of the feature film Pride
Chauncey Eskridge - Attorney who represented Martin Luther King Jr. and Muhammad Ali; judge
Erroll Garner - Jazz pianist and composer
John Greene - NFL player
Jon Henderson - NFL player
Dakota Staton - Jazz vocalist
Ahmad Jamal - Jazz pianist
Dave Kalina - NFL player
Mose Lantz - NFL player
Tony Liscio - NFL player
Bill Nunn, Jr. - Administrator, Pittsburgh Steelers; newspaper editor and sports writer
Wendell H. Phillips -  Member Maryland House of Delegates
Maurice Stokes - NBA player
Billy Strayhorn - Jazz composer
Adam Wade - Singer, musician and actor; first African-American game-show host
Mary Lou Williams - Jazz pianist/composer-arranger

References

External links
 
 Pittsburgh Public Schools
 National Center for Education Statistics data for Westinghouse High School

School buildings on the National Register of Historic Places in Pennsylvania
Educational institutions established in 1917
High schools in Pittsburgh
Neoclassical architecture in Pennsylvania
City of Pittsburgh historic designations
Pittsburgh History & Landmarks Foundation Historic Landmarks
Public high schools in Pennsylvania
Public middle schools in Pennsylvania
1917 establishments in Pennsylvania
National Register of Historic Places in Pittsburgh